Rick Ufford-Chase, born in York, Pennsylvania, is a peace activist and long-time member of the Southside Presbyterian Church in Tucson, Arizona.  He was elected Moderator of the General Assembly of the 216th General Assembly of the Presbyterian Church (USA) on June 26, 2004. Ufford-Chase was 40 years old at the time, the youngest PC (USA) moderator in recent history. Ufford-Chase was the first Presbyterian Church (USA) moderator to serve for two years.  Previous moderators served one-year terms.

Biography
Ufford-Chase is a graduate of Dallastown Area High School, he has a bachelor's degree from Colorado College and entered Princeton Theological Seminary, but says he soon discovered that his call was not to be an ordained minister, but to serve in ministry as an elder. He has received honorary degrees from Hastings College and Bloomfield College (2006), Austin College (2007), and Eden Theological Seminary (2008). He also received the Dignitas Humana Award for Human Rights work from St. John's School of Theology and Seminary in Collegeville, MN (2007).

Activism
Ufford-Chase founded BorderLinks, a bi-national organization that tries to connect and educate people of faith on both sides of the United States/Mexico border. He had served BorderLinks for 17 years prior to being elected as the Presbyterian Church's moderator.  He leads a Migrant Trail walk, a 120-kilometre trek, in early June through the Sonoran Desert.

Ufford-Chase also worked with the Evangelical Center for Pastoral Studies in Central America in Guatemala, and has been a co-moderator of Presbyterian Peace Fellowship. With his wife, Kitty, he has been trained to serve as a reservist with Christian Peacemaker Teams, an organization that has sent teams of "accompaniers" to Colombia, Iraq, Palestine and the United States/Mexico border region.

On December 12, 2005, he spoke at Arizona Major State Day, at the Washington National Cathedral.

In April 2006, he visited the First Presbyterian Reformed Church of Havana.

In June 2006, after the end of his term as PC (USA) moderator, Ufford-Chase accepted a call as the Executive Director of the Presbyterian Peace Fellowship. While there, and acting as the first full-time appointed Executive Director, Ufford-Chase was a founding member of both the Christian Peace Witness for Iraq, and the Olive Branch Interfaith Peace Partnership.

In March 2008, Ufford-Chase with his wife Kitty were named transitional co-directors of Stony Point Center, a conference center of the Presbyterian Church (USA) in Stony Point, New York. While assuming this position with his wife in August 2008, Ufford-Chase continues half-time as Director of the Presbyterian Peace Fellowship.

Works
Sermon “This Very Night: The Time Is Now”, Rick Ufford-Chase, Brentwood Presbyterian Church, August 8, 2004

References

External links
Bio on PCUSA Website
U-C: What I See Rick's blog
Rick's twitter
Borderlinks Website
Presbyterian Peace Fellowship Website
Christian Peace Witness for Iraq Website
Olive Branch Interfaith Peace Partnership Website
Stony Point Center Website
"Following Luke’s Jesus in a Time of Fear", 30 Good Minutes, Chicago Public Television
Declaration of Peace Speech, 9/26/2006, T&B Press, U-Tube
Rick Ufford-Chase becomes Executive Director, December 21, 2007, U-Tube 
"Illegal Immigrants Divide Churches, Politicians", Ted Robbins, Weekend Edition Saturday, National Public Radio, March 4, 2006
Presbyterians take action on Israel, 23 February 2005, ABC National Radio
Blog of 2014 delegation Rick led to Israel/Palestine

American Presbyterians
American humanitarians
Calvinist pacifists
Colorado College alumni
Year of birth missing (living people)
Living people
People from York, Pennsylvania